A Stanza of Sunlight on the Banks of Brahmaputra is the historic first collaborative Indo-British bilingual book of poetry in English and Assamese, under the joint authorship of novelist, short-story writer, columnist and poet Arnab Jan Deka and poet, blogger and novelist Tess Joyce. The book received wider international acclaim and recognition as a major literary work in the genre of Indo-British literature. This book was first published in 2009, in both the UK and India, by Philling Books (UK) and Spectrum Publications (India).

Genesis of the book
This book contains some poems composed in 2009 by British poet, environmentalist and novelist Tess Joyce together with some of the early poems of Arnab Jan Deka composed during his school-student days, which were earlier compiled in his first Assamese book of poetry Ephanki Rhode in 1983. That first book of poetry made him a major writer in India, with many more titles added to his literary oeuvre later on. His status as a leading Indian litterateur of the 20th century was acknowledged by the Indian Government's official Academy of Letters Sahitya Academy, when its President Dr Birendra Kumar Bhattacharya wrote an evocative critical essay on his poetry, and subsequently, the author's literary biography was incorporated in the End Century Edition of the Academy's publication Who's Who of Indian Writers 1999.
Both poets themes in this book revolved in and around the banks of the river Brahmaputra, which flows through China, India and Bangladesh. The poems contain both scenic and evocative, spiritual contents, and also highlights the environmental fragility of the river and its surrounding flora and fauna.
Literary critic Arindam Barooah, in a review published in the English daily The Assam Tribune, highlighted the genesis of the book with these words: "Arnab Jan Deka, a popular short story writer, columnist and an environmentalist in Assamese and English and Tess Joyce, a British poet and environmentalist have jointly came up with a beautiful, evocative piece of writing titled ‘A Stanza of Sunlight on the Banks of Brahmaputra’ published by Spectrum Publications to the world of Assamese and English literature. A mélange of poems both in Assamese and English, which reflects the beauty of the Brahmaputra and its milieu, cultures of the riverine people in a poetical and emblematic approach. An impression to its essence of nature embracing the historical civilization still continues to hold." The same review continues with more details about the various stages of development of the book: "Though the mystical yet riveting Brahmaputra has always been the most liked metaphor in major literary works of several writers and poets, but, Arnab Deka’s and Tess Joyce’s poems have something unique to say to arouse readers’ inquisitive senses. It was Joyce’s fondness for the Brahmaputra that led to the publication of the book jointly with Arnab Jan Deka, when she experienced Assam. For her, the Brahmaputra is the epitome of that gold, when the reflection of sun rays of the setting sun descends into the mighty river, the hue metamorphoses into golden trough. Moreover, with the release the book, all the authors' proceeds will go to an awareness campaign Save the Brahmaputra River charity launched by the global non-profit NGO Assam Foundation-India. The campaign is to protect the river from the dumped waste, water pollution, soil erosion at the banks and flooding, as well as threats to wildlife, including the endangered river dolphins and also creating awareness about the threats and benefits of dams being constructed in and around the Brahmaputra River."

Critical acclaims
This book of poetry received critical praise in many publications. The literary journal The Book Review published a review of the book by literary critic and poet N. Kalyani, wherein she had undertaken a comparative study and critical analysis of the poetry of both the authors. The critic wrote: "A Stanza of Sunlight on the Banks of Brahmaputra, another bilingual book by Arnab Jan Deka and Tess Joyce, the former an Indian writer writing in English and Assamese, and the latter an English writer. The 24 poems by Arnab and 21 by Tess, composed since the early 1980s, have been presented in both the Assamese and English languages. While most poems are set in Assam, there are the more general ones too, on Nature, beauty and life and set in places other than Assam and the Brahmaputra, as for instance, in Meghalaya, Delhi and Noida. A Haiku by Tess titled Brahmaputra River II goes thus: Touch the black, soft sand,/Of the fluid, gold lagoon./Don't throw rubbish bags. And in These Small Thoughts Deka reveals what Umananda is, A tiny river island amidst the mighty river Brahmaputra near the prehistoric city of Pragjyotishpur, known by its modern name Guwahati now, in a way that brings the image so alive: The tiny rivulet reflect a myriad of colour/The distant Umananda--a majestic aloof lily pad/The blackish riverbank with flowing wind/The cities dreaming of fleeced nomad/Besides the tidal marina."
Critic Arindam Barooah further elaborated his observations in The Assam Tribune: "Most of the poems have a societal tune in their theme and substance amidst the virtues of the nature and some of them have elementary touch of various places they have been like Delhi, Meghalaya etc apart from the Brahmaputra and its vicinity. The Poems are simple to read and easy to comprehend. Each of the poems is different from one another. Be its content, style of narration and imaginative aspect but, it connects and goes with the same motif. The simplicity and lucidity of the words both of them had put on clearly reflects their own experience and strength of emotions on the beauty of nature. The way Tess Joyce has transliterated Arnab’s Assamese poems with British English touch is indeed remarkable. Her absolute gamble of words and the elucidation of the poetry have given new interpretation yet a parallel touch for the avid reader globally."
Poet Tess Joyce, in an article published in UK-based literary journal Luit to Thames, as well as on the Spain-based website Art of Living Guide, wrote about her unique experiences of composing poetry through exploration of the spiritual and heritage contents in company of her co-author Arnab Jan Deka along the river Brahmaputra.

Preservation at London Poetry Library
The London Poetry Library, which collects and preserves books of poetry of high literary value, has given A Stanza of Sunlight on the Banks of Brahmaputra a place of pride in its library in London. This constitutes the first such official recognition to Assamese poetry.

References

http://www.deccanherald.com/content/29856/young-briton-takes-up-cause.html
https://web.archive.org/web/20150626110401/http://www.thebookreviewindia.org/author/arnab-jan-deka/2957.html
https://web.archive.org/web/20160304094310/http://epaper.timesofindia.com/Repository/getFiles.asp?Style=OliveXLib%3ALowLevelEntityToPrint_TOINEW&Type=text%2Fhtml&Locale=english-skin-custom&Path=TOIM%2F2009%2F08%2F10&ID=Ar01204
http://www.biblio.com/9788183440240
books.google.co.uk/books?id=QA1V7sICaIwC&pg=PA304&lpg=PA305&dq=bhabananda+deka&source=bl&ots=i-ma90ROIf&sig=fKygeEp5AZz_tpKaQbPyKDk0hBs&hl=en&sa=X&ei=Gfh7VKnJNsHo8AX2oIII&ved=0CE8Q6AEwCTha#v=onepage&q=bhabananda%20deka&f=false
http://www.assamtribune.com/scripts/showpage.asp?id=dec2714%2C11%2C1083%2C162%2C330%2C1995
http://www.poetrylibrary.org.uk/news/library/?id=573

Assamese literature
Indian poetry collections
Poetry anthologies
2009 poetry books